Artumpara, also Arttum̃para, Artembares (Persian name, *Rtambura, self-identified as "the Mede)  was an Achaemenid Satrap of Lycia circa 400-370 BCE. He was involved in the Great Satraps' Revolt on the side of central Achaemenid authority in 366-360 BCE, helping to put down the rebel Datames. He is well known for his coinage.

Artumpara is known to have competed for power with another man named Mithrapata. It is thought he was defeated by Perikle.

Coinage
The portrait of Artumpara appears on his coinage, wearing the Achaemenid satrapal headdress.

References

4th-century BC Iranian people
Military leaders of the Achaemenid Empire
Satraps of the Achaemenid Empire
Lycians